Sujathapuram is a village in Mysore district of Karnataka state, India.

Location
Sujathapuram is located some 2.6 km north of Nanjangud town near Mysore city. Kabini river flows through Sujathapuram village.

Villages and suburbs

 
     Chamlapurada Hundi layout  0.6 km
     Nanjangud Industrial Estate  3 km
     Doddakanya - Ainsley Wilson  5.4 km
    Tata Iron and Steel Mines 5.6 km
     Kadakola village  6.7 km
     Byathalli village 7.2 km
 Korehundi village

Post office
Sujathapruam village has a post office and the postal code is 571302.

Access
Sujathapuram has a railway station on Mysore–Chamarajanagar branch line. There are six trains running forward and backward in this route.  Five of them are slow moving passenger trains.  One express train to Bangalore is also available.

Image gallery

See also
Kadakola
Thandavapura
Nanjangud Town
Chinnada Gudi Hundi

References

Villages in Mysore district
Villages in Chamarajanagar district